23rd Street Ferry may refer to:
23rd Street Ferry (Exchange Place), connecting West 23rd Street, Manhattan with Exchange Place, Jersey City (Pennsylvania Railroad) across the Hudson River
23rd Street Ferry (Williamsburg), connecting East 23rd Street, Manhattan with Broadway, Williamsburg across the East River
23rd Street Ferry (Greenpoint), connecting East 23rd Street, Manhattan with Greenpoint Avenue, Greenpoint across the East River
Pavonia Ferry, connecting West 23rd and Pavonia Terminal (Erie Railroad), Jersey City